Chadron State Park is a public recreation area located within the Nebraska National Forest,  south of Chadron, Nebraska, in the northwestern portion of the state. The park's  include a portion of the Pine Ridge escarpment and Chadron Creek. The park is wooded with ponderosa pine throughout and cottonwood trees near the creek and lagoon.

History
Chadron State Park was established in 1921, making it Nebraska's oldest state park. The Civilian Conservation Corps was active in the park in the 1930s:

In August 2012, with the park threatened by the 58,000+ acre West Ash Wildfire, crews set backfires in the park to deprive the fire of fuel. The controlled burns worked and saved all structures and equipment. The park reopened to visitors in September 2012. Although 90% of the park burned, no infrastructure was lost and its forest survived intact, with most of the fire having stayed on the ground as an understory grass fire.

Activities and amenities
Activities include swimming in a regulation-sized pool, horseback riding, archery, disc golf, hiking, tennis, sand volleyball, and fishing. The park has rental paddleboats, hiking trails, campground, and cabins.

References

External links

Chadron State Park Nebraska Game and Parks Commission
Chadron State Park Map Nebraska Game and Parks Commission

State parks of Nebraska
Protected areas of Dawes County, Nebraska
Protected areas established in 1921
Civilian Conservation Corps in Nebraska